Stalker is a fictional antihero and swords and sorcery character published by DC Comics. The character, created by Paul Levitz and Steve Ditko, debuted in Stalker #1 (June/July 1975). The art in all four issues of Stalker was handled by the team of Ditko (pencils) and Wally Wood (inks).

Publication history
The Stalker title lasted four issues (July 1975 to Jan. 1976) before it was cancelled by DC.

When discussing the creation of the character, Levitz recalled, "Carmine had literally had stuck his head in and said", “Joe, I need two more sword and sorcery books. One’s coming out in January, you’re two months late on it, and one’s out in February, you’re only one month late on it.” "I may be getting the months wrong but I think that’s about what it was." He walks out and I say, “I could write one, you know. I like sword and sorcery, I can try that, Joe.” And Joe said, “All right, come in with something tomorrow.” "I went home and I channeled my best Michael Moorcock and came up with Stalker". "He handed it to Ditko, who needed work. And I’m just… amazed."

Levitz elaborated on his influences "the heart of the inspiration [for Stalker] was Michael Moorcock's Eternal Champion series"

Fictional character biography
A young warrior seeking immortality and power challenges and defeats the Demon Lord Dgrth, winning immortality but losing his soul. The young warrior now known as Stalker the Soulless begins a quest to regain his lost soul. However, the more he traveled the greater his power grew, and the more he physically resembled Dgrth. Stalker eventually fights his way to the demon god in the depths of that dimension's netherworld, and defeats him, only to discover that the deity has already used up the energies of the traded soul. The only way to get his soul back would be to end the existence of that dimension's supreme deity, a solution which could only occur after the abolishment of all war.

Stalker the Souless later appeared in Swamp Thing Vol. 2 #163, arriving on Earth alongside Claw the Unconquered, Isis, Arion and Starfire. This storyline suggested that all DC "heroic fantasy" worlds were creations of Jim Rook (Nightmaster)'s mind, but this has been contradicted since.

JSA Returns
Stalker appeared in All-Star Comics (vol. 2) #1, and as a recurring theme in a retroactive story featuring the Justice Society of America at the end of World War II, the so-called "JSA Returns" event. Here, the soulless Stalker had evolved into an insane demon/supervillain, looking a lot like Dgrth, and bent on destroying dimension after dimension in his quest to end all conflict by ending all life. He was defeated and seemingly destroyed in a time warp generated by the Hourman android.

Wonder Woman

Stalker reappears in present-day in Wonder Woman vol. 3 #20, again alive, younger, more human and reminiscent of his original self – possibly this is the same Stalker, somehow plucked from a point earlier in his life/personal timeline than the Stalker appearing in the above-mentioned JSA event. Here, he requests that Wonder Woman kill a demon from his dimension named D'Grth. To these ends he encourages her to recruit Beowulf Prince of Geats, and Claw the Unconquered. During this adventure Wonder Woman gives Stalker the proper name of Elpis, which means "hope" in Themyscirian. When D'Grth and Grendal eventually appear, Stalker reveals that he deceived the trio of warriors as a means of gaining his soul back at the bidding of D'Grth. He then throws his sword at Diana but Beowulf jumps in its way at the last second. Claw sees to Beowulf's wounds while Wonder Woman confronts Stalker. She tells him that Elpis is a female name. She then manages to steal the Rock of Destiny from Stalker and uses it to transport herself and D'Grth to Earth, leaving Stalker in his own world with an aspect of a soul. It is discovered that the soul Stalker possesses is in truth Diana's soul, which slowly began leaving her body shortly after her and Stalker's first meeting. Stalker, though reluctant, agreed to return Diana's soul to her and joined in the final destruction of D'Grth. He then leaves with an oracle as a companion.

The New 52
In DC's 2011 relaunch of its continuity, The New 52, Stalker (by Marc Andreyko and Andrei Bressan) is now reintroduced to The New 52 universe as a back-up feature in Sword of Sorcery.

DC Rebirth
The Batman Beyond version of Stalker appears in the DC Rebirth title Batman Beyond.

Other versions
Reference was made to Stalker in the alternate reality created by Brother Grimm and Mirror Master where the Speed Force never existed, Captain Cold telling the Flash that he read a book about this world's history that explained that the Stalker had killed Mr. Terrific without Jay Garrick there to help the fight, causing such damage to American morale that the JSA helped to deploy a bomb that annihilated Germany before retiring in disgust at themselves.

In other media
A futuristic, African version of Stalker appears in media set within the DC Animated Universe, voiced by Carl Lumbly. A former big game hunter and poacher, he underwent an experimental surgery to restore his back after being injured by a panther and gained enhanced dexterity, strength, senses, and reflexes:
 Stalker first appears in the Batman Beyond animated television series. Introduced in the episode "Bloodsport", Stalker hunts and kills the panther that injured him, but becomes bored with hunting animals and travels to Neo-Gotham to hunt Terry McGinnis / Batman in an attempt to restore meaning to his life. The former discovers the latter's secret identity, takes his brother hostage to lure him out, and easily defeats him, but Batman tricks Stalker into electrocuting himself, damaging his spine. He suffers hallucinations of the panther and runs off before being run over by a train and presumed dead. Despite this, in "Plague" Stalker survived and was captured by the NSA, who recruited him to hunt False-Face after the terrorist organization Kobra turned him into a carrier for a deadly super-virus. Along the way, Stalker re-encounters Batman and reluctantly works with him to stop Kobra and False-Face.
 Stalker appears in the Batman Beyond tie-in comics. In vol 2 #6, he tries to trap McGinnis while he is on an island trip with his friends. In #18, Stalker returns to track down Blight.
 Stalker makes a non-speaking appearance in the Justice League Unlimited episode "Epilogue". At some point in time, he joined the Iniquity Collective and ran afoul of the Justice League.

Collected editions
 The Steve Ditko Omnibus Volume 1 includes Stalker #1–4, 480 pages, September 2011,

References

External links
DCU Guide: Stalker
A Brief History of Sword-and-Sorcery Comics

1975 comics debuts
DC Comics characters who can move at superhuman speeds
DC Comics characters with superhuman strength
DC Comics superheroes
DC Comics titles
DC Comics fantasy characters
Fantasy comics
Fictional swordfighters in comics
Characters created by Paul Levitz
Characters created by Steve Ditko
Comics by Paul Levitz
Comics by Steve Ditko